Moegistorhynchus longirostris is a keystone species of fly that lives on the west coast of South Africa.

Anatomy 
M. longirostris has a very long proboscis that is believed to be the product of an evolutionary arms race between pollinating insects and long-tubed flowers.

Ecology 
The species pollinates, partly or exclusively, at least 20 species of Iridaceae, Geraniaceae, and Orchidaceae.

References 

Nemestrinoidea
Taxa named by Christian Rudolph Wilhelm Wiedemann
Insects described in 1819
Diptera of Africa
Endemic insects of South Africa